Martin Zeman (born 28 March 1989) is a Czech footballer playing as a forward. He was also a Czech U21 international.

References

External links
 
 
 Player Profile

1989 births
Living people
Czech footballers
Czech Republic youth international footballers
Czech Republic under-21 international footballers
Czech expatriate footballers
Association football forwards
Association football midfielders
People from Tábor
AC Sparta Prague players
FC Viktoria Plzeň players
FC Admira Wacker Mödling players
FK Senica players
1. FK Příbram players
FC Sion players
Hapoel Ra'anana A.F.C. players
FC Slovan Liberec players
Bruk-Bet Termalica Nieciecza players
Slovak Super Liga players
Swiss Super League players
Israeli Premier League players
Ekstraklasa players
I liga players
Expatriate footballers in Switzerland
Expatriate footballers in Austria
Expatriate footballers in Slovakia
Expatriate footballers in Israel
Expatriate footballers in Poland
Czech expatriate sportspeople in Switzerland
Czech expatriate sportspeople in Austria
Czech expatriate sportspeople in Slovakia
Czech expatriate sportspeople in Israel
Czech expatriate sportspeople in Poland
Sportspeople from the South Bohemian Region